Cinta Jangan Pergi is a 2013 Malaysian television series starring Tiz Zaqyah, Remy Ishak and Josiah Hogan. The 26 episodes drama was broadcast by TV9 (original channel). The first episode was first aired on 6 April 2013 and concluded on 30 June 2013. This drama was created by Filmscape Production.

Cast

Main cast
Tiz Zaqyah as Lea Soraya
Remy Ishak as Kalil
Josiah Hogan as Hud

Extended cast
Ramona Zam Zam as Shireen
Nadiya Nisaa as Elyna
Bil Azali as Jaydee
Kartina Ayob as Lily (Lea's mom)
Aleza Shadan as Nora (Kalil's mom)
Sheila Mambo as Hasmah (Hud's mom)
Esma Daniel as Ibrahim (Kalil's dad)
Faradhiya as Tasha (Kalil's stepmom)

References

External links
Cinta Jangan Pergi TV9

Malaysian drama television series